Regina Guha (died 1919) was an Indian lawyer and teacher. In 1916, she fought a notable case challenging the interpretation of legal provisions that effectively prohibited women from practicing law in India.

Life 
Regina Guha was born to Pearay Mohan Guha (a lawyer) and Simcha Gubbay, a Baghdadi Jewish woman. Her father later converted to Judaism as well, and Regina and her three siblings were raised in the Jewish faith. Regina and her sister Hannah, studied law. Her sister, Hannah Sen, went on to become a teacher, and politician.

Career 
Regina completed her Master of Arts in 1913, earning a first class degree, and standing first in her class. She went on to earn a law degree, the Bachelor in Laws in 1915, from Calcutta University. She then applied to be enrolled as a pleader (lawyer) in the Alipore District Judge's court, but her application was rejected on the grounds that women were not permitted to enrol. Regina challenged this decision at the Calcutta High Court, arguing that the governing legislation, The Legal Practitioner's Act, allowed qualified "persons" to enrol as lawyers, and that the definition of 'person' included women. She was represented by Eardley Norton, a lawyer and member of the Indian National Congress. A bench of five male judges of the Calcutta High Court ruled, in the case of In Re Regina Guha, that although the governing law, the Legal Practitioners Act 1879, used the term 'person' in regard to enrolment, this term did not include women. They accordingly denied her the right to enroll as a lawyer.

Guha went on to become the headmistress of the Jewish Girls' School in Kolkata, and was the first Jewish principal of the school.

Guha's case was similar to comparable litigation fought at the time in the United Kingdom and USA, in Bebb vs Law Society and Bradwell v Illinois. It was followed in India by a second unsuccessful petition when Sudhanshubala Hazra challenged the prohibition against women practitioners in the Patna High Court.  In 1923, the enactment of the Legal Practitioners (Women) Act eventually removed this restriction, allowing women to enroll and practice law. The act was passed after Guha's demise, but her siblings established an endowment at Calcutta University in her memory to mark its passage, awarding a medal to the student who stood first in the M.A. English examination each year.

Additional reading 

 In re Regina Guha (1916) 21 CWN 74 the Calcutta High Court).

References 

20th-century Indian lawyers
21st-century Indian women lawyers
21st-century Indian lawyers
Indian lawyers
University of Calcutta alumni
Indian Jews
People from Kolkata
1919 deaths
Year of birth missing
20th-century Indian women
20th-century Indian people
Indian educators
Indian women educators
19th-century Indian educators
20th-century Indian educators
Women educators from West Bengal
Educationists from India
20th-century Indian educational theorists
19th-century Indian educational theorists
Indian educational theorists
Indian women educational theorists
Indian activists
Indian feminists
Indian women's rights activists
Indian schoolteachers